New Hampshire's 16th State Senate district is one of 24 districts in the New Hampshire Senate. It has  been represented by Republican Keith Murphy since 2022.

Geography
District 16 covers parts of Hillsborough and Rockingham Counties, including the towns of Candia, Raymond, and Hooksett, as well as the city of Manchester's 1st ward.

The district is entirely within New Hampshire's 1st congressional district.

Recent election results

2022

*Republican Michael Yakubovich was replaced on the ballot with Keith Murphy due to illness.
 Elections prior to 2022 were held under different district lines.

Historical election results

2020

2018

2017

2016

2014

2012

Federal and statewide results in District 16

References

16
Hillsborough County, New Hampshire
Merrimack County, New Hampshire
Rockingham County, New Hampshire